Telman Valiyev (born 25 April 1994) is a Azarbaijani judoka.

He is the bronze medallist of the 2019 Judo Grand Slam Baku in the -73 kg category.

References

External links

 

1994 births
Living people
Azerbaijani male judoka
20th-century Azerbaijani people
21st-century Azerbaijani people